Loricaria simillima is a species of catfish in the family Loricariidae. It is native to South America, where it occurs in the basins of the Amazon River, the Orinoco, and the Río de la Plata in Argentina, Brazil, Ecuador, Paraguay, Peru, and Venezuela. The species reaches 26.4 cm (10.4 inches) in standard length and is believed to be a facultative air-breather.

Loricaria simillima appears in the aquarium trade, where it is often referred to as the marbled whiptail.

References 

Loricariidae
Fish described in 1904